The 2020-21 North Dakota Fighting Hawks basketball team represented the University of North Dakota in the 2020-21 NCAA Division I men's basketball season. The Fighting Hawks were led by second-year head coach Paul Sather and played their home games at the Betty Engelstad Sioux Center in Grand Forks, North Dakota, as members of the Summit League.

Previous season
Under first-year head coach Paul Sather, the Fighting Hawks finished the 2019–20 season with a record of 15–18 overall, 7–9 in Summit League play to finish sixth place. It was a monumental year for the Fighting Hawks as they reached the championship game of the Summit League tournament for the first time before losing to rival North Dakota State. The Fighting Hawks also defeated Big Ten opponent Nebraska during the regular season by a score of 75–74.

Roster

Schedule and results

|-
!colspan=12 style=| Non-conference regular season

|-
!colspan=12 style=| Summit League regular season

|-
!colspan=12 style=| Summit League tournament
|-

|-

Source

References

North Dakota Fighting Hawks men's basketball seasons
North Dakota Fighting Hawks men's basketball
North Dakota Fighting Hawks men's basketball
North Dakota Fighting Hawks